Early general elections were held in Luxembourg on 20 October 2013. The elections were called after Prime Minister Jean-Claude Juncker, at the time the longest-serving head of government in the European Union, announced his resignation over a spy scandal involving the Service de Renseignement de l'État (SREL). The review found Juncker deficient in his control over the service.

Although the elections saw Juncker's Christian Social People's Party (CSV) lose three seats, but remain the largest party in the Chamber of Deputies with 23 of the 60 seats, Xavier Bettel of the Democratic Party (DP) succeeded him as Prime Minister.

Background

After a spy scandal involving the Service de Renseignement de l'État illegally wiretapping politicians, the Grand Duke and his family, as well as allegations of paying for favours in exchange for access to government ministers and officials leaked through the press, Prime Minister Juncker submitted his resignation to the Grand Duke on 11 July 2013, upon knowledge of the withdrawal of the Luxembourg Socialist Workers' Party from the government and thereby losing its confidence and supply in the Chamber of Deputies. Juncker urged the Grand Duke for the immediate dissolution of parliament and the calling of a snap election.

Electoral system

The 60 members of the Chamber of Deputies were elected by proportional representation in four multi-member constituencies; 9 in North constituency, 7 in East, 23 in South and 21 in Centre. Voters could vote for a party list or cast multiple votes for as many candidates as there were seats. Seat allocation was calculated in accordance with the Hagenbach-Bischoff quota.

Voting was compulsory for all citizens between the age of 18 and 75, whilst those over 75 and citizens living abroad were the only ones allowed to vote by post. Failure to vote could have resulted in a fine of between €100 and €250.

Parties
Nine parties contested the election, of which five won seats in the Chamber of Deputies at the last election: the Christian Social People's Party (CSV), the Luxembourg Socialist Workers' Party (LSAP), the Democratic Party (DP), the Greens, the Alternative Democratic Reform Party (ADR), and The Left.  Two extra-parliamentary parties also ran: the Communist Party (KPL) and Pirate Party Luxembourg (PPLU). In addition, the Party for Full Democracy (PID), which was headed by independent deputy Jean Colombera, also contested the election. All parties that ran in the election submitted lists in all constituencies.

Opinion polls

Results

By locality

As in 2004 and 2009, the CSV won pluralities in each of Luxembourg's four constituencies. However, the CSV's performance declined in all constituencies from 2009. The CSV held up the best in Centre, where it lost only 3.29% compared to its 2009 result. The CSV's sharpest decline was in North, where the party lost 5.91%. It nonetheless held a 10% lead over DP in North; North was the last constituency to not vote for the CSV at the national level, when the DP beat the CSV by 2% in North in 1999. Overall, despite a relative decline, the CSV retained a comfortable lead in all constituencies, both in votes and in seats.

By constituency

Distribution of seats by constituency

Government formation
Following the elections, the Democratic Party, the Socialist Workers' Party and The Greens began initial talks about forming a coalition (dubbed the "Gambia coalition", after Gambia's flag colours, a local variant of the German traffic light coalition), pushing the Christian Social People's Party into the opposition for the first time since 1979. On 25 October, Xavier Bettel, the leader of the Democratic Party and mayor of Luxembourg City, was named formateur by the Grand Duke of Luxembourg. The negotiations were finished by 29 November, as planned.

The new Bettel–Schneider Ministry was sworn in on 4 December. It succeeded the Juncker–Asselborn Ministry II.

References

Luxembourg
Chamber of Deputies (Luxembourg) elections
2013 in Luxembourg
October 2013 events in Europe